Niederweiler may refer to the following places in Germany:

 Niederweiler, Bitburg-Prüm
 Niederweiler, Rhein-Hunsrück

It is also the German form of Niderviller in Alsace-Lorraine, which has been in Germany at various times.